Tomás Valeriano Gómez Sánchez (born 15 December 1957) is a Spanish socialist politician and economist. From 21 October 2010 to 22 December 2011 was the Minister of Labor and Immigration in the ninth legislature under the presidency of José Luis Rodríguez Zapatero.

Political career 
Bachelor of Economics and Business Administration, he specializes in Labor Economics from the Complutense University of Madrid. Member of the General Union of Workers (UGT) and the Spanish Socialist Worker's Party (PSOE), worked as an economist in the Technical Cabinet of the Confederal Executive Committee of UGT. He has been an executive advisor in the Ministry of Labor and Social Security from 1988 to 1994 and State Secretary of Employment from 2004 to 2006. He was advisor to the Economic and Social Council of Spain.

The day of the general strike of 2010, was present at the head of the demonstration in Madrid against the labor reform

Minister of Labor 
On 20 October 2010, he was appointed Minister of Labor by Prime Minister José Luis Rodríguez Zapatero, and took possession before the king Juan Carlos the same day

Deputy 
He participated in the general elections of 20 November 2011 as number three of the PSOE list for Madrid, being elected deputy. After leaving the ministerial portfolio, he focused on his work as a deputy, serving as spokesperson for the Socialist Group in the Economy Committee of the Congress of Deputies, a position he left 1 January 2015 after discrepancies with Pedro Sánchez.

Awards 
Gentleman of the Grand Cross of the Order of Charles III (2011).

References

1957 births
Living people
Complutense University of Madrid alumni
Government ministers of Spain
Members of the 10th Congress of Deputies (Spain)
Spanish Socialist Workers' Party politicians
People from the Province of Jaén (Spain)
Spanish trade unionists
Unión General de Trabajadores members